Leshibitse is a village in Kgatleng District, Botswana. The village is located 85 km north of Mochudi, and it has a primary school. The population was 407 in 2001 census.

References

Kgatleng District
Villages in Botswana